The Society of Actuaries in Ireland is the professional body of Irish actuaries. The Society was founded on 3 May 1972 by seventeen members of the Institute and the Faculty of Actuaries residing in Ireland. Since then, the membership has grown to more than 1,900. The current president of the Society is Declan Lavelle.

The Society is a full member of the International Actuarial Association and the Actuarial Association of Europe.

Membership

The Society of Actuaries in Ireland offers five types of membership:
 Student
 Associate
 Fellow
 Honorary fellow
 Affiliate

The Society does not hold its own examinations and its members gain fellowship through the examinations organised by the Institute and the Faculty of Actuaries. As of 2019, the Society has more than 1,900 members, 1,250 of them fully qualified.

External links

Society of Actuaries in Ireland official website

Actuarial associations
1972 establishments in Ireland
Organizations established in 1972
Professional associations based in Ireland